Hemigenia cuneifolia is a plant in the family Lamiaceae and is endemic to eastern Australia. It is a shrub with oblong leaves arranged in whorls of three, and blue to mauve flowers.

Description
There are four stamens, the lower two more or less sterile, and the style has two branches. Flowering mainly occurs from August to April.

Taxonomy and naming
Hemigenia cuneifolia was first formally described in 1870 by George Bentham and the description was published in Flora Australiensis from specimens collected by William Woolls and Hermann Beckler.

Distribution and habitat
Hemigenia cuneifolia grows in forest from south east Queensland to the Hill Top area of New South Wales and as far inland as the Pilliga Scrub.

References

cuneifolia
Endemic flora of Australia
Flora of New South Wales
Flora of Queensland
Plants described in 1870
Taxa named by George Bentham